Melaleuca pustulata, commonly known as yellow paperbark, warty paperbark or Cranbrook paperbark is a plant in the myrtle family, Myrtaceae and is endemic to Tasmania in Australia. It is an uncommon shrub, one of only two melaleucas that are endemic to that state and one of only eight found naturally occurring there. It has thick, pimply leaves, hairy new growth and large numbers of heads of pale yellow, fragrant flowers in spring or early summer.

Description
The mature leaves have distinct raised oil glands giving the leaves a blistered appearance.

The flowers are white to yellowish, scented and arranged in spikes or heads on the ends of branches that continue to grow after flowering. There are five bundles of stamens around the flower, each with 5 to 9 stamens.

Melaleuca pustulata is sometimes confused with Melaleuca ericifolia, which also occurs naturally in Tasmania; however, the leaves of that species lack the raised oil glands of M. pustulata and the outer surface of its flower cup (hypanthium) is hairy.

Taxonomy and naming
Melaleuca pustulata was first formally described in 1847 by Joseph Hooker from specimens collected "in Campbell Town and Oyster Bay".

'Melaleuca' is derived from Greek and means 'black and white', a reference to the color of the bark.

The specific epithet (pustulata) is derived from the Latin word pustula meaning "pimple", "blister" or "bubble", referring to the prominent oil glands on the leaves of this species.

Distribution and habitat
This melaleuca occurs near the east coast of Tasmania usually in dry heath, often on shallow soils derived from dolerite.

Conservation status
Melaleuca pustulata is declared a rare species under the Tasmanian Government Threatened Species Protection Act 1995.

Use in horticulture
Melaleuca pustulata is a useful plant for hedges and windbreaks.

References

Flora of Tasmania
pustulata
Plants described in 1847